The following are the records by Benin in athletics recognised by the Fédération Béninoise d'Athlétisme (FBA).

Outdoor

Key to tables:

h = hand timing

X = unratified due to doping violation

Men

Women

Indoor

Men

Women

Notes

References
General
World Athletics Statistic Handbook 2019: National Outdoor Records
World Athletics Statistic Handbook 2022: National Indoor Records
Specific

External links

Benin
Records
Athletics